Robert Alexander Ravensberg (October 20, 1925 – February 12, 2007) was an American football player.  Ravensberg was born in Bellevue, Kentucky, where his family operated a diner.  He was a two-time Kentucky high school pole vault champion who set a state record in the event.  He enrolled at Indiana University on varsity letters in football in 1943, 1944, 1945 and 1947.  He was a starter on Indiana's 1945 team, the school's only undefeated and outright Big Ten Conference championship team.  In 1945, he was selected as a consensus first-team All-American football player at the end position.  After graduating from Indiana, Ravensberg played two seasons of professional football in the National Football League (NFL) for the Chicago Cardinals from 1948 to 1949.  He was an assistant football coach at Indiana from 1950 to 1951.

References

1925 births
2007 deaths
American football ends
Chicago Cardinals players
Indiana Hoosiers football coaches
Indiana Hoosiers football players
All-American college football players
People from Bellevue, Kentucky
Players of American football from Kentucky